Lysebotn is a village in Sandnes municipality in Rogaland county, Norway.  The village is located at the eastern end of the Lysefjorden in a very isolated valley that is only accessible by one road or by boat. The name itself means the "bottom [end] of the Lysefjorden".  It's a destination for over 100,000 tourists annually, and it is an access point for the Kjerag mountain, a popular Base Jumping spot. There are cruises and an express boat to Lysebotn from Skagenkaien in the city of Stavanger, Lauvvik in Sandnes, and the village of Forsand.  All of which pass beneath the famous Preikestolen cliff on the way to Lysebotn.  Lyse Chapel, built in 1961, is found at Lysebotn. Lysebotn at one time had its own school, but that is now closed.

Economy
Lysebotn is largely populated by workers at the nearby Lysebotn Hydroelectric Power Station and Tjodan Hydroelectric Power Station, both of which are built inside the surrounding mountains. The two power plants provide electricity for more than 100,000 people.

Lysebotn today has its own campground, bed & breakfast, and tourist cabins. Guided kayak tours and other activity offerings are available during the summer. There are also trailheads near Lysebotn for access to the Lyseheiane back-country, and a huge flume for Lyse Power nearby, that generates hydroelectricity.

Transportation
The only way in to Lysebotn is by boat or by the spectacular Lysebotnvegen (Lysebotn road), officially known as Lyseveien (Bokmål) and Lysevegen (Nynorsk), which connects it to the nearby municipality of Sirdal in Agder county. The road was opened in 1984 and it is open only in the summer, when it is ice free and safe. At the top of the turns is Øygardstølen which has a parking lot, food service, and a service building for hiking trips to the nearby Kjerag mountain, Kjeragbolten boulder, and Kjeragfossen waterfall.

References

External links
 
 Rødne Lines Lysefjord cruise
 Map
 Lysebotn
 Norwegian Wiki for Lyse Kraftverk

Villages in Rogaland
Sandnes